Mhowgaon is a Nagar Panchayat under Sub Division Dr. Ambedkar Nagar (Mhow) in Indore district in the Indian state of Madhya Pradesh. The total geographical area of Mhowgaon nagar panchayat is 13.5 km2 (1350 hectares) and it is the smallest city by area in the sub district. The population density of the city is 2309 persons per km2. Mhowgaon is divided into 15 wards for which elections are held every 5 years. Among them, Mhowgaon Ward No. 2 is the most populous ward with a population of 3440 and Mhowgaon Ward No. 15 is the least populous ward with a population of 957. Mhowgaon Nagar Panchayat has total administration over 6,373 houses to which it supplies basic amenities like water and sewerage. It is also authorized to build roads within Nagar Panchayat limits and impose taxes on properties coming under its jurisdiction.

The nearest railway station is Mhow Cantt which is 6 km far from here. Mhow is the sub district headquarters and the distance from the city is 4 km. The district headquarters of the city is Indore which is 29 km away. Bhopal is the state headquarters of the city and is 221 km from here. The pin code of Mhowgaon is 453441.

Connectivity
The Gambhir river divides Dr. Ambedkar Nagar (Mhow) cantt. area and Mhowgaon. The Mhow-Neemuch major district road passes over the Gambhir river from where the town starts and ends towards kankarpura lake. There is no railway connectivity to the town. The nearest railway station is Mhow railway station which is 4 km from the town. The nearest airport from the town is Indores Devi Ahilya Bai Holkar Airport, which is approximately 25 km away.

Demographics

As of the 2011 Census of India, Mhowgaon had a population of 30,012. Males constitute 52.61% (from 54% in 2001) of the population and females 47.39% (from 46% in 2001). The population of children of the age of 0-6 is 3996, which is 13.31% of the total population of Mhowgaon (NP). Among them about 16 thousand (53%) are male and about 14 thousand (47%) are female. 76% of the whole population are from the general caste, 17% are from the schedule caste and 6% are from schedule tribes. There are 6373 households in the city and an average 5 persons live in each family. 

Hinduism is the majority religion of Mhowgaon with 93.59% in which schedule Caste (SC) constitutes 17.49% while Schedule Tribe (ST) were 6.05% of total population in Mhowgaon (NP).

Growth of population 

The population of the city has increased by 46.2% in the last 10 years. In the 2001 census the total population was about 21 thousand people. The female population growth rate of the city is 49.2% which is 5.6% higher than the male population growth rate of 43.6%. The general caste population has increased by 46.6% while the Schedule caste population has increased by 49.9%. Schedule Tribe population has increased by 32.7% and child population has increased by 13.4% in the city since the last census.

Sex Ratio 

In Mhowgaon Nagar Panchayat, Female Sex Ratio is of 900 against the state average of 931. Sex ratio in general caste is 893, in schedule caste is 922 and in schedule tribe is 939. There are 877 girls under 6 years of age per 1000 boys of the same age in the city. Overall sex ratio in the city has increased by 33 females per 1000 male during the years from 2001 to 2011. Moreover, Child Sex Ratio in Mhowgaon is around 877 compared to Madhya Pradesh state average of 918, child sex ratio here has decreased by 38 girls per 1000 boys during the same time. Female Sex ratio per 1000 male in Hindus are 900 in Muslims are 892.

Literacy

Literacy rate of Mhowgaon city is 87.40% higher than both the state average of 69.32% and the national average of 74.04%. More than 26 thousand people in the city are literate, among them around 14.5 thousand are male and around 11.6 thousand are female, male literacy is 91.75%, and female literacy is 82.58%. In Mhowgaon, 17% of the population is under 6 years of age. Overall literacy rate in the city has increased by 5%. Male literacy has gone up by 2% and the female literacy rate has gone up by 11%.

Workers profile 

Mhowgaon has 32% (9571) population engaged in either main or marginal works. 52% male and 9% female population are working population. 48% of total male population are main (full time) workers and 4% are marginal (part-time) workers. For women 7% of the total female population are main and 2% are marginal workers. Out of the total population, 9,571 were engaged in work or business activity. Of this 8,267 were males while 1,304 were females. In a census survey, a worker is defined as a person who does business, job, service, and cultivator and labour activity. Of total 9571 working population, 90.42% were engaged in Main Work while 9.58% of total workers were engaged in Marginal Work.

Colony divisions

 It has many important colonies build up during present
1) Suman Colony
2) Annapurna colony
3) Hari Nagar   
4) Shri nath   
5) Khatipura   
6) Bajrang mohalla   
7) Bhagwati vihar   
8) Tehsil Colony   
9) Maruti nagar
10) Shanti Nagar
11) South Shanti Nagar
12) Shiv Nagar Colony
13) Bhagirath Colony
14) Shri Raam Nagar
15) Shri Raam Nagar (Aashiyana)
16) Kankar Pura
17) Gaikawad
18) Diamond Colony
19) Super City
20) Utkarsh Vihar 
21) Madan Vihar 
22) Sai City 
23) Samriddhi Vihar
24) Goswami Residency

Climate
Mhowgaon has a borderline humid subtropical climate (Köppen climate classification Cwa) and tropical savanna climate  (Aw). Three distinct seasons are observed: summer, monsoon and winter.

Summers start in mid-March and can be extremely hot in April and May. The daytime temperatures can touch  on more than one occasion. Average summer temperatures may go as high as  but humidity is very low.

Winters are moderate and usually dry. Lower temperatures can go as low as - on some nights. Usually the temperature ranges between 8 and 26 °C during winters.

Rains are due to southwest monsoons. The typical monsoon season goes from 15 June till mid-September, contributing 32–35  inches of annual rains. 95% of rains occur during the monsoon season.

Mhowgaon gets moderate rainfall of  during July–September due to the southwest monsoon.

Banks in Mhowgaon
Bank of India
Narmada Jhabua Gramin Bank

References



Cities and towns in Indore district
Mhow